Emrehan Gedikli (born 25 April 2003) is a German professional footballer who plays as a forward for Austrian Bundesliga club Austria Lustenau, on loan from Trabzonspor.

Club career
Gedikli made his professional debut for Bayer Leverkusen in the UEFA Europa League on 26 November 2020, coming on as a substitute in the 80th minute for Karim Bellarabi against Israeli Premier League side Hapoel Be'er Sheva. The home match finished as a 4–1 win for Leverkusen.

On 7 February 2022, Gedikli signed a 4.5-year deal with Turkish side Trabzonspor.

On 18 January 2023, he joined Austrian club Austria Lustenau on loan until the end of the season.

International career 
Gedikli has represented Germany at all youth international levels from the under-15 set-up, all the way up to the under-19 national team.

In 2022, he accepted a call-up from the Turkish under-21 national team.

Personal life
Gedikli was born in Oberhausen, North Rhine-Westphalia, and is of Turkish descent.

Honours
Trabzonspor
 Süper Lig: 2021–22
 Turkish Super Cup: 2022

References

External links
 
 
 

2003 births
Living people
Sportspeople from Oberhausen
German people of Turkish descent
Footballers from North Rhine-Westphalia
German footballers
Association football forwards
Germany youth international footballers
Bayer 04 Leverkusen players
Bundesliga players
Trabzonspor footballers
Süper Lig players
SC Austria Lustenau players
Austrian Football Bundesliga players
German expatriate footballers
Expatriate footballers in Turkey
German expatriate sportspeople in Turkey

Expatriate footballers in Austria
German expatriate sportspeople in Austria